Miller Nash LLP is an American law firm based in Portland in the U.S. state of Oregon. Established in 1873, the limited liability partnership has 153 attorneys firm wide. As of 2017, it was the third largest law firm in Portland when it had 86 attorneys in the Portland area. The headquarters are located in the U.S. Bancorp Tower in Downtown Portland, with other offices in Long Beach, California and Seattle.

History
The firm began in 1873 as Northup & Gilbert, started by William B. Gilbert and Henry H. Northup. In 1876, former governor A. C. Gibbs joins the firm, but leaves the following year. John M. Gearin joined in 1884 before later serving in Congress. Later partners include Wallace McCamant, W. Lair Thompson, and Ralph King, among others. In 1970, the firm moved into what is now the Standard Insurance Center, and the names Miller and Nash first appeared in the firm name. The firm moved into the new U.S. Bancorp Tower in 1983. In 1985, the firm opened an office in Seattle. The Miller Nash moniker was adopted in 1999.

Miller Nash received some criticism for representing whalers in 2012 who had been involved in incidents with the Sea Shepherd. The current iteration of the firm came about from the merger of Portland-based Miller Nash and Seattle-based Graham & Dunn announced in 2014. The merger was completed on January 2, 2015.

References

External links
Miller Nash Graham & Dunn LLP - U.S. News & World Report

1873 establishments in Oregon
Law firms based in Portland, Oregon
Privately held companies based in Oregon
Law firms established in 1873